Vironchaux is a commune in the Somme department in Hauts-de-France in northern France.

Geography
Vironchaux is situated 14 miles(22.5 km) north of Abbeville, on the D16 road.

Population

See also
Communes of the Somme department

References

Communes of Somme (department)